Houghton Library, on the south side of Harvard Yard adjacent to Widener Library, is Harvard University's primary repository for rare books and manuscripts. It is part of the Harvard College Library, the library system of Harvard's Faculty of Arts and Sciences.

History 

Harvard's first special collections library began as the Treasure Room of Gore Hall in 1908. The Treasure Room moved to the newly built Widener Library in 1915. In 1938, looking to supply Harvard's most valuable holdings with more space and improved storage conditions, Harvard College Librarian Keyes DeWitt Metcalf made a series of proposals which eventually led to the creation of Houghton Library, Lamont Library, and the New England Deposit Library. Funding for Houghton was raised privately, with the largest portion coming from Arthur A. Houghton Jr., in the form of stock in Corning Glass Works. Construction was largely completed by the fall of 1941, and the library opened on February 28, 1942.

Along with much else, Houghton holds collections of papers of Samuel Johnson, Emily Dickinson, Henry Wadsworth Longfellow, Margaret Fuller, John Keats, Ralph Waldo Emerson and his family, Amos Bronson Alcott and his daughter Louisa May Alcott, along with the papers of other notable transcendentalists, Theodore Roosevelt, T.S. Eliot, E.E. Cummings, Henry James, William James, James Joyce, John Updike, Jamaica Kincaid, Gore Vidal, and many others.

Houghton also holds the letters of Colonel Robert Gould Shaw, who commanded the 54th Massachusetts during the Civil War, and was killed during the assault on Fort Wagner.

Collections

Houghton has five main curatorial departments:
Early Books and Manuscripts, which includes a large collection of Medieval and Renaissance manuscripts and over 2,500 incunabula.
Early Modern Books and Manuscripts, featuring the Donald and Mary Hyde Collection of Dr. Samuel Johnson, one of the largest collections of books and manuscripts relating to Samuel Johnson and his circle.
Modern Books and Manuscripts, which collects material from 1800 to the present, including the papers and libraries of Emily Dickinson, John Keats, Leon Trotsky, Gore Vidal, John Updike, Amy Lowell, and collector Julio Mario Santo Domingo, Jr., among many others.
Modern Books & Manuscripts New Acquisitions Blog
Printing & Graphic Arts which documents the history and art of book production. It was founded in 1938 by Philip Hofer.
The Harvard Theatre Collection covering the history of the performing arts.

References

External links

 Houghton Library home page
 Houghton 75: Celebrating Houghton Library's 75th Anniversary
 Online exhibition: Public Poet, Private Man: Henry Wadsworth Longfellow at 200
 Online exhibition: Books in Books: Reflections on Reading and Writing in the Middle Ages
 Online exhibition: Harvard's Lincoln
 Online exhibition: A Monument More Durable Than Brass: The Donald and Mary Hyde Collection of Dr. Samuel Johnson
 Online exhibition: History of the Harry Elkins Widener Memorial Collection
 Online exhibition: "I shall ever be your dearest love": John Keats and Fanny Brawne
 Online exhibition: "Such a Curious Dream!: Alice's Adventures in Wonderland at 150
 Houghton Library Blog
 Department of Modern Books & Manuscripts new acquisitions blog

University and college academic libraries in the United States
Research libraries in the United States
Literary archives in the United States
Libraries in Massachusetts
Archives in the United States
Harvard Library
Harvard University buildings
1938 establishments in Massachusetts
Libraries in Middlesex County, Massachusetts
Libraries established in 1938
Library buildings completed in 1941
Rare book libraries in the United States
Special collections libraries in the United States